Runaway is an album by Bill Champlin, released on Elektra Records in 1981.  It is notable as containing "Tonight Tonight", Champlin's minor hit as a solo artist, as well as "Sara", which also achieved a degree of chart success.

History

The album was released as component of Champlin's development of his solo career, following his longtime association with the Sons of Champlin.  Champlin's first solo album, Single, had been released in 1978, on Full Moon Records, following Champlin's departure from the Sons of Champlin in 1977.  Runaway was also released in the same year that Champlin commenced a near thirty-year association with Chicago. According to Champlin, Runaway prompted his decision to join Chicago, due to the record executive overseeing his project leaving Elektra on the day of its release.

The album received mixed reviews, based on critics viewing it as a weaker version of Chicago material that Champlin was contributing to at the same time.  The album has been described as an "historic curio, a period artifact, and not much more".

The album was primarily produced by David Foster, who had also produced Champlin's previous solo album, Single, in 1978.  The album also featured production by Kenny Loggins on "Take It Uptown", co-written by Loggins and Champlin.  One of the comparatively rare songwriting collaborations with Alan Thicke is also included on the album--"Sara", co-written with Champlin. The single "Tonight, Tonight" was originally composed as the ballad "My Everlasting Love" on the self-titled second album from Ray Kennedy, a song which Champlin contributed background vocals on.

The album entered the Billboard album chart on February 6, 1982.  It spent 4 weeks on the chart, peaking at #178.

Despite initially mixed critical reaction, the album was re-released on CD by Warner Bros. in 1996, and as a Japanese export as of 1998.

The album track "Gotta Get Back to Love" would later be covered by R&B group Sister Sledge on their 1983 George Duke produced album Bet Cha Say That to All the Girls. Champlin's last solo album for a major label, No Wasted Moments (Elektra), was released in 1990.

Track listing

"Runaway" (Bill Champlin, Steve Lukather) (3:58)
"One Way Ticket" (Champlin, George Sopuch) (3:03)
"Sara" (Champlin, Alan Thicke) (3:15)
"Tonight Tonight" (Champlin, David Foster, Raymond Louis Kennedy) (3:47)
"Runaway Reprise" (Champlin, David Foster) (0:47)
"Take It Uptown" (Champlin, Kenny Loggins) (4:24)
"Satisfaction" (Champlin, Richard Page) (3:42)
"Stop Knockin' on My Door" (Barron Abramovich, Champlin) (4:16)
"Gotta Get Back to Love" (Kerry Hatch, Tom Kelly) (3:30)
"Without You" (Champlin, Amber DiLena) (4:05)
"The Fool Is All Alone" (Champlin, David Foster) (4:29)

Personnel 
 Bill Champlin – arrangements, lead vocals (1-4, 6-11), backing vocals (1, 2, 3, 6-11), string arrangements (4, 9), vocals (5), pianos (5), guitars (5), acoustic piano (6, 8), Hammond organ (8), lead guitar (8)
 David Foster – arrangements, synthesizers (1, 3, 5, 7, 9, 11), string arrangements (1, 3, 7, 9), backing vocals (1, 4), keyboards (2, 3, 4, 10), Moog bass (5, 7), Linn LM-1 (5), Fender Rhodes (6, 7, 8), pianos (9, 11)
 Steve Lukather – guitars (1, 2, 3, 7, 10), rhythm guitar (8), lead guitar (9)
 Jay Graydon – guitars (4, 6, 11), rhythm guitar (9)
 John Pierce – bass (1, 2, 3, 6, 8, 11)
 Abraham Laboriel – bass (4, 9)
 Leland Sklar – bass (10)
 John Robinson – drums (1, 3, 6, 7, 8, 11)
 Ed Greene – drums (2)
 Larry Tolbert – drums (4, 9)
 Jeff Porcaro – drums (10)
 Paul Lani – percussion (3, 7)
 Humberto Gatica – percussion (4, 9), tambourine (8), snare sound (8)
 Gary Herbig – tenor saxophone (4), saxophones (7)
 Tom Scott – tenor saxophone (6)
 Kim Hutchcroft – saxophones (7)
 Larry Williams – saxophones (7)
 Charlie Loper – trombone (7)
 Bill Reichenbach Jr. – trombone (7)
 Jerry Hey – flugelhorn (4), brass arrangements (6), trumpet (7), horn arrangements (7)
 Chuck Findley – trumpet (7)
 Gary Grant – trumpet (7)
 James Newton Howard – string arrangements (11)
 Harry Bluestone – concertmaster (4)
 Tom Kelly – backing vocals (1, 9)
 Richard Page – backing vocals (2, 4, 7, 9, 11)
 Venette Gloud – backing vocals (4)
 Kenny Loggins – backing vocals (6)
 Carmen Grillo – backing vocals (8)
 Tamara Matoesian – backing vocals (8)

Production
 David Foster –  producer
 Kenny Loggins – producer (6)
 Humberto Gatica – engineer, mixing
 Paul Lani – additional engineer, second engineer 
 David Leonard – additional engineer, second engineer 
 Bobby Gerber –  second engineer
 Gregg Jampol – second engineer
 Peggy McCreary – second engineer
 Tony Pappa – second engineer
 Ernie Sheesley – second engineer
 Patrick Von Wiegandt – second engineer
 Aaron Rapoport – photography
 John Kosh – art direction, design

References

1981 albums
Albums produced by David Foster
Elektra Records albums